Operation Alba ("Sunrise" or "Dawn" in Italian) was a multinational peacekeeping force sent to Albania in 1997. Led by Italy, it was intended to help the Albanian government restore law and order during the Albanian Civil War.

Beginning in early 1997, the Albanian government lost control of much of their country, culminating in the desertion of many police and military units and the looting of their armories. The resulting chaos caused several countries to autonomously evacuate their nationals from Albania, which prompted concerns about the fate of others. The United Nations Security Council consequently adopted Resolution 1101 to establish an operation that would stabilize the situation. The Italian 3rd Army Corps assumed responsibility for the stop-gap mission as Operation Alba, the first multinational Italian-led mission since World War II. The eleven nations that participated in this operation were Austria (60 troops), Belgium (15), Denmark (110), France (950), Greece (800 or 803), Italy (3800), Portugal, Romania (400), Slovenia (20), Spain (350) and Turkey (760).

Causes of the intervention 
Operation Alba was launched in response to the serious social crisis that had followed the collapse of major pyramid schemes in Albania in early 1997. The loss of many Albanians' life savings invested in these schemes, in addition to dissatisfaction with political corruption and recent electoral irregularities, caused large parts of the country to rise in rebellion against the Albanian government. As governmental control and rule of law collapsed, widespread looting and violence broke out. Early operations were carried out by individual countries to evacuate their citizens, but Alba was launched in an effort to resolve more extensive issues. Italy in particular was determined to curb the migratory flow of Albanian refugees that threatened to reach alarming dimensions. Disaster struck on 28 March, when the Italian patrol vessel Sybilla collided with a refugee boat. Dozens of Albanian migrants perished, in what became known as the Tragedy of Otranto. Expecting the possibility of having to resort to force to restore order in Albania, Italy took care to acquire a mandate of the United Nations, the support of the OSCE, and the participation of a number of allies; when this was accomplished, Operation Alba was launched.

Operations in Albania 
Beginning on April 15, 7,265 troops were deployed under the command of the operation - of which more than half were Italian nationals - and quickly restored order in Tirana. The primary objectives of the mission included apprehending criminals and collecting looted weapons, but in later months operation troops also helped retrain Albanian forces to modern standards. Operation Alba finally concluded in August, as the last troops were withdrawn from the country.

References

External links
 
Contribution of the Hellenic Army in Operation Alba 

Albanian Civil War

United Nations operations in Europe